Scars & Memories is a full-length album by Manhattan, New York rapper MF Grimm, released July 19, 2005 (see 2005 in music) via his own Day by Day Entertainment label. While most of the tracks were written during the early 1990s, the original song reels were stolen, forcing Grimm to re-record many of the tracks. This album blends past hip hop styles with new techniques, and features exclusive interviews with Grimm that show not only how his evolution as an artist, but also the changes in his perspective of life.

Scars & Memories contains a number of Grimm's singles from the Dolo and Fondle 'Em labels, as well as unreleased material. In addition to the songs, the album contains seven short interview clips featuring Grimm answering questions about his life. Due to the varying source material, some of the tracks are of far lower sound quality than others.

Songs
Some songs here are presented with different names than their original releases, and some were re-recorded when the reels were either lost or stolen. "Take 'Em to War (Original Version)" was originally released as "WWIII," and "AIDS" was originally released as "Stay Strapped." The song "Do It for the Kids" appears here in a different form than the one originally released on Fondle 'Em, but that was due to a clerical error with the label releasing the wrong version of the song in 1996.

The songs "Scars & Memories," "Emotions," and "Get Down" were re-recorded since the original reels were lost. There are audible differences between the originals and the versions that appear on the album.

Track listing

Miscellanea
 The title track, Scars & Memories, was written by MF Grimm immediately after he came out of his coma.
 The original reels for this album were stolen.
 The album art pictures MF Grimm standing up, despite the fact that has been using a wheelchair since 1994.

References

MF Grimm albums
2005 albums
Albums produced by MF Doom